Inner Urge is an album by guitarist Larry Coryell which was recorded in 2000 and released on the HighNote label the following year.

Reception

In his review on Allmusic, Ken Dryden states "This very enjoyable session is heartily recommended". All About Jazz said "The possibilities that Inner Urge offers are those, in large part, of bebop. Consistent in his presentation, Coryell remains out front on each tune as a relaxed, unpretentious and brilliant presence ... Inner Urge presents a locked-in group for the joyful exploration of jazz, which drives the inner urge of them all".

Track listing 
All compositions by Larry Coryell except where noted
 "Compulsion" (Harold Land) – 5:30
 "Abra Cadabra" (Santi Debriano) – 5:45
 "Inner Urge" (Joe Henderson) – 5:25
 "Tonk" (Ray Bryant) – 4:48
 "Dolphin Dance" (Herbie Hancock) – 8:01
 "Allegra's Ballerina Song" – 6:48
 "In a Sentimental Mood" (Duke Ellington, Manny Kurtz, Irving Mills) – 5:50
 "Turkish Coffee" – 3:59
 "Terrain" (Land) – 8:51

Personnel 
Larry Coryell – guitar
Don Sickler – trumpet (tracks 1 & 9)
John Hicks – piano (tracks 1–7 & 9)
Santi Debriano – bass (tracks 1–3, 5–7 & 9)
Yoron Israel – drums (tracks 1–7 & 9)

References 

Larry Coryell albums
2001 albums
HighNote Records albums
Albums recorded at Van Gelder Studio